No. 650 Squadron RAF was an anti aircraft co-operation squadron of the Royal Air Force during the Second World War.

History
No. 650 squadron was formed on 1 December 1943 at RAF Cark, Cumbria, from 'D' Flight of 289 Squadron and 1614 (Anti-Aircraft Co-operation) Flight RAF. Commanded by Squadron Leader Victor Verity, it was equipped with Miles Martinets for target towing, and later also used Hawker Hurricanes in that role. In November 1944 it moved to RAF Bodorgan, Anglesey, Wales and was disbanded there on 26 June 1945.

Aircraft operated

Squadron bases

See also
List of Royal Air Force aircraft squadrons

References

Notes

Bibliography

External links
 History of No.'s 621–650 Squadrons at RAF Web

Military units and formations established in 1943
Aircraft squadrons of the Royal Air Force in World War II
Military units and formations disestablished in 1945
650 Squadron